The 2020 United States presidential election in Louisiana was held on Tuesday, November 3, 2020, as part of the 2020 United States presidential election in which all 50 states plus the District of Columbia participated. Louisiana voters chose electors to represent them in the Electoral College via a popular vote, pitting the Republican Party's nominee, incumbent President Donald Trump, and running mate Vice President Mike Pence against Democratic Party nominee, former Vice President Joe Biden, and his running mate California Senator Kamala Harris. Louisiana has eight electoral votes in the Electoral College.

Trump won Louisiana on the day of the election 58.5% to 39.9%, a margin of 18.6%, down from 19.4% in 2016. Per exit polls by the Associated Press, his strength in Louisiana came from White born-again/Evangelical Christians as well as conservative Roman Catholics who have a high population in Louisiana, who supported Trump with 91% and 80% of their vote. On the issue of abortion, 57% of voters believed abortion should be illegal in most or all cases. As is the case in most southern states, there was a stark racial divide in voting for this election: Whites supported Trump by 77%–22% while African-Americans supported Biden by 88%–10%.

Primary elections
The primary elections were originally scheduled for April 4, 2020. On March 13, they were moved to June 20 due to concerns over the COVID-19 pandemic. Then on April 14, they were further pushed back to July 11.

Republican primary
Incumbent President Donald Trump was essentially uncontested in the Republican primary. The state has 46 delegates to the 2020 Republican National Convention.

Democratic primary

General election

Predictions

Polling
Graphical summary

Aggregate polls

Polls

with Donald Trump and Generic Opponent

with Generic Republican and Generic Democrat

Results

Statewide results

Results by parish

By congressional district
Trump won 5 of the 6 congressional districts in Louisiana.

Notes

 Partisan clients

See also
 United States presidential elections in Louisiana
 Presidency of Joe Biden
 2020 Louisiana elections
 2020 United States presidential election
 2020 Democratic Party presidential primaries
 2020 Republican Party presidential primaries
 2020 United States elections

References

Further reading

External links
 
 
  (State affiliate of the U.S. League of Women Voters)
 
 . (Guidance to help voters get to the polls; addresses transport, childcare, work, information challenges)

Louisiana
2020
Presidential